Bosnia and Herzegovina U21 national football team is made up by players who are 21 years old or younger and represents Bosnia and Herzegovina in international football matches at this age level.

The national U21 team has never qualified for a major tournament, but has had a couple of near misses, including in 2006, when they played Czech Republic during the 2007 UEFA European Under-21 Football Championship qualification playoffs but lost on aggregate. The Czechs won 2–1 at home, while the result was a 1–1 draw in Sarajevo.

Competitive record

UEFA European U21 Championship record

2023 UEFA European U21 Championship Qualifiers

Recent results and forthcoming fixtures

2021

2022

Personnel

Current technical staff

Coaching history

Players

Current squad
The following players were called up for friendly game against China on 26 March 2023.

Caps and goals correct as of 25 November 2022 after the game against Bulgaria.

Recent call-ups
The following eligible players have been called up for the team within the last twelve months:

WD
 

INJ Withdrawn due to injury.
PRE Preliminary squad.
SUS Suspended.
WD Withdrew.

See also
European Under-21 Football Championship
Bosnia and Herzegovina national football team
Bosnia and Herzegovina national under-19 football team
Bosnia and Herzegovina national under-18 football team
Bosnia and Herzegovina national under-17 football team
Bosnia and Herzegovina national under-15 football team
Bosnia and Herzegovina women's national football team

References

External links

Facebook
FS
Futbol24

Goal
Klix
Soccerway

SportSport
UEFA
worldfootball

 
European national under-21 association football teams
Bosnia and Herzegovina national youth football teams